Gregory R. Becker (born April 5, 1954) is an American politician who served in the New York State Assembly from the 21st district from 1983 to 1998.

Biography 
Becker was born on April 5, 1954 in Lynbrook, New York. He attended Nassau County Community College and received his B.S. degree from Long Island University.

In 1998, Becker unsuccessfully ran for Congress in New York's 10th congressional district against Democrat Carolyn McCarthy.

References

1954 births
Living people
Republican Party members of the New York State Assembly

Long Island University alumni
Nassau Community College alumni
People from Lynbrook, New York